Georgi Aleksandrovich Makhatadze (born 26 March 1998) is a Russian football player who plays as a defensive midfielder for Kuban Krasnodar.

Club career
He made his debut in the Russian Premier League for FC Lokomotiv Moscow on 21 May 2016 in a game against FC Mordovia Saransk.

On 24 August 2018, he was released from his contract with FC Rubin Kazan by mutual consent.

On 28 August 2018, he rejoined Lokomotiv, and was assigned to the farm-club FC Kazanka Moscow.

On 11 June 2021, he moved to Rotor Volgograd in the FNL.

International
He represented Russia national under-17 football team in the 2015 UEFA European Under-17 Championship, in which he was selected for the team of the tournament, and later in the 2015 FIFA U-17 World Cup, in which he scored twice against South Africa.

Career statistics

Club

Honours
Individual
 2015 UEFA European Under-17 Championship Team of the Tournament

References

External links
 
 

1998 births
Sportspeople from Rostov-on-Don
Russian sportspeople of Georgian descent
Living people
Russian footballers
Russia youth international footballers
Association football midfielders
FC Lokomotiv Moscow players
FC Rubin Kazan players
FC SKA-Khabarovsk players
FC Rostov players
FC Rotor Volgograd players
FC Urozhay Krasnodar players
Russian Premier League players
Russian First League players
Russian Second League players